Martin Krainz (born 20 May 1967) is an Austrian ice hockey player. He competed in the men's tournament at the 1994 Winter Olympics.

References

1967 births
Living people
Austrian ice hockey players
Olympic ice hockey players of Austria
Ice hockey players at the 1994 Winter Olympics
Sportspeople from Klagenfurt
20th-century Austrian people